Compsibidion paulista is a species of beetle in the family Cerambycidae. It was described by Martins in 1962.

References

Compsibidion
Beetles described in 1962